Shiva is a 2006 Indian Hindi-language action film produced and directed by Ram Gopal Varma. The film was a prequel to the original 1990, Shiva, which is a remake of the 1989 Telugu film of the same name. The film was screened at New York Asian Film Festival. The film was dubbed in Telugu as Shiva 2006. Later was dubbed in Tamil as Udhayam 2006. The movie was failure at box office.

Plot
The film begins with the brutal murder of a Mumbai man named John by a group of gangsters led by ruthless kingpin Bappu Ganesh (Upendra Limaye). As time goes on, Bappu becomes more and more powerful, until he manages to seize power from the government of Maharashtra and make himself chief minister of the state to seize all of Maharashtra's money. Shiva Swarassi (Mohit Ahlawat) is a poor slum-dweller who, after watching his parents being brutally murdered by Bappu's men, decides that it's time to get rid of Bappu. He gets the people of Dharavi Slum in Mumbai together and forms a rebellion against him.

Cast
 Mohit Ahlawat .... Sub-Inspector Shiva Kumar
 Nisha Kothari .... Sandhya Joshi
 Upendra Limaye .... Bappu Ganesh
 Shereveer Vakil .... John
 Ninad Kamat .... Bollywood
 Dilip Prabhawalkar .... Home Minister Manohar Shirke
 Nagesh Bhonsle .... Inspector Sudhir Kamat
 Zakir Hussain .... Inspector Sawant
 Raju Mavani .... Inspector Tavde
 Pankaj Jha .... Inspector Salim Inamdar
 Ranvir Shorey .... Daksh Kumar
 Suchitra Pillai .... Manasi
 Dinesh Lamba .... Hawaldar Atmaran Bhende
 Sanjeev Wilson .... Inspector Sarvar Sheikh
 Ganesh Mayekar .... Chutney
 Raam .... Mukadam
 Vinod Jayawant .... Bharti

Music
The music was composed by Ilaiyaraaja. The song "Saara Yeh Aalam" is based on "Ananda Ragam" from the Tamil film Panneer Pushpangal (1981).

Hindi Soundtrack

Telugu Soundtrack

Tamil Soundtrack

Reception 
Sukanya Varma of Rediff rated the film 1 out of 5 stars.

References

External links
 

2006 films
2000s Hindi-language films
Films directed by Ram Gopal Varma
Indian sequel films
Films scored by Ilaiyaraaja